This article lists all international competitions in women's football (soccer). The competitions included are for national teams as well as club sides. Competitions past and present are included. Note that some competitions may not be directly run by the governing body for the region.

For domestic competitions see the article Women's football around the world.

Competitions

See also
 List of association football competitions
 List of women's association football clubs

References

External links
 FIFA official website
Global Sports Archive - results from various countries, etc.
The Rec.Sport.Soccer Statistics Foundation.

Women